In enzymology, a fatty-acid O-methyltransferase is an enzyme that catalyzes the chemical reaction

S-adenosyl-L-methionine + a fatty acid  S-adenosyl-L-homocysteine + a fatty acid methyl ester

Thus, the two substrates of this enzyme are S-adenosyl methionine and fatty acid, whereas its two products are S-adenosylhomocysteine and fatty acid methyl ester.

This enzyme belongs to the family of transferases, specifically those transferring one-carbon group methyltransferases.  The systematic name of this enzyme class is S-adenosyl-L-methionine:fatty-acid O-methyltransferase. Other names in common use include fatty acid methyltransferase, and fatty acid O-methyltransferase.

References

 

EC 2.1.1
Enzymes of unknown structure